California State University, Dominguez Hills (CSUDH, CSU Dominguez Hills, or Cal State Dominguez Hills) is a public university in Carson, California.  It was founded in 1960 and is part of the California State University (CSU) system.

In 2020, the university had an enrollment of 17,763 students, comprising 15,873 undergraduates (89.4%) and 1,890 post baccalaureates (10.6%). About half of all students identify as the first in their families to go to college. CSUDH is one of the most ethnically and economically diverse universities in the western United States. It enrolls the largest number and percentage of African American students of any CSU campus. CSUDH is consistently ranked nationally as a top degree producer for minority students, including graduating more African American students than any public university in California.

CSUDH offers 53 bachelor's degree programs, 26 Masters programs, a variety of single, multi-subject and specialized teaching credentials, and undergraduate, graduate, and post-baccalaureate certificate programs within its six colleges: College of Arts and Humanities, College of Business Administration and Public Policy, College of Education, College of Extended and International Education, College of Health, Human Services and Nursing, and College of Natural and Behavioral Sciences. The university is accredited by the WASC Senior College and University Commission (WSCUC). It is designated as a Hispanic-Serving Institution and is nationally accredited in business administration, chemistry, clinical sciences (cytotechnology, medical technology), computer science, education, health science (orthotics and prosthetics), music, nursing, occupational therapy, public administration, social work (MSW), and theatre arts. The campus offers small class sizes for its students. There are six cultural and identity centers on campus. 

The campus sits on the historic Rancho San Pedro, the oldest land grant in the Los Angeles area. The land was in the continuous possession of the Dominguez family through seven generations – from its concession to Juan Jose Domínguez in 1784 to its acquisition by the state of California for the university. The campus mascot is the Toro, Spanish for bull.

History

The foundation for what would become CSU Dominguez Hills was built in 1960 when then Governor of California Pat Brown provided state funds to begin development of the campus. It was originally to be located in Palos Verdes, California, and known as South Bay State College. The tentative name was changed to California State College at Palos Verdes in 1962. In 1964, architect A. Quincy Jones designed a master plan for construction. As the permanent campus had not yet been constructed, the first classes were held in 1965 at the California Federal Savings Bank in Rolling Hills Estates, California. The college began with an enrollment of approximately 40 students.

In 1965 the designated location for the campus was moved to the Dominguez Hills in Carson.  The Palos Verdes site was abandoned due to high land prices in Palos Verdes, and the Watts Riots exposing a need for a campus to serve the populations of South Los Angeles.

The university was established, in large part, as a response to the African American outcry for higher education standards and opportunities. In October and November 1969, demonstrations regarding the Vietnam War were held on the campus. In 1977 the California Postsecondary Education Commission endorsed the college trustees' desire to change the name of the school from California State College, Dominguez Hills to California State University, Dominguez Hills.

CSUDH was selected as the host venue for 1984 Los Angeles Summer Olympics cycling competition. Between 1981 and 1982, the Olympic Velodrome was constructed on the campus. The US cycling team won nine gold medals on the track during the Olympics. The 333.3-meter-long track was demolished in 2003 and replaced by the ADT Event Center (now known as the VELO Sports Center) in 2004. It remains the only Olympic-standard velodrome in the United States.

In 1992, the university opened the Donald P. and Katherine B. Loker Student Union. A major expansion was completed in 2007, adding the 800-seat Dominguez Ballroom. The CSUDH Extended Education Building was opened in 2000, followed by the completion of James L. Welch Hall in 2002. It was named after a long-time CSUDH faculty member.

In 2021, CSUDH opened three major new on-campus buildings, designed to expand the campus’ academic capabilities and help transform the campus from a commuter school to a destination institution. The new Student Resident Housing complex can accommodate over 500 students. The complex includes double, triple, and quadruple bedrooms, a laundry room, study rooms, several lounges, and other amenities. It features eight 47-foot-high murals by Los Angeles artist iris yirei hu. The Science and Innovation Building houses the university's chemistry, biology, and physics programs. It is also the home of the Toyota Center for Innovation in STEM Education, which includes a fabrication lab, SMART classrooms, and labs for K-12 teacher demonstrations. The campus' Innovation and Instruction Building is the home of the university's College of Business Administration and Public Policy. The building includes a 250-seat auditorium, collaborative learning classrooms, distance learning spaces, event spaces, and faculty offices.

Academics

CSU Dominguez Hills is a major university for the Southern geographical region of Los Angeles County and Orange County. It offers 53 undergraduate majors, 26 master's degrees, and a number of certificate and credential programs. The campus is accredited by the following associations: Western Association of Schools and Colleges, the Association of Collegiate Business Schools and Programs, AACSB International, the National Association of Schools of Public Affairs and Administration, the National Association of Schools of Music, and the National Association of Schools of Theatre. Dominguez Hills is also the administrative headquarters of the California State University's Statewide Nursing Program.

CSUDH has been designated a Hispanic-Serving Institution and is a member of the Computing Alliance of Hispanic-Serving Institutions. Its College of Education & College of Arts and Humanities offers training in Spanish for bilingual education teachers. As of 2018, CSUDH had the third largest percentage of Latino Americans that are not Mexican-American in the CSU system. (Latino Americans with heritage from the Caribbean, Central America, South America). The university ranked first in California in 2021 for the number of bachelor's degrees conferred on Black students.

The campus is home to the American Indian Institute, which has the goal of increasing the number of Indigenous students who enroll and graduate from the CSU system. Starting in 2011, CSUDH and the AII began hosting the "Honoring the Indigenous Peoples of the Americas" Pow Wow.

CSUDH students conduct research and present their findings at the campus' Annual Student Research Day. The annual event is open to undergraduate and graduate students. Outstanding research projects are selected for inclusion at the CSU Statewide Student Research Competition.

CSUDH's McNair Scholars Program was established in 2004. It is named after NASA mission specialist Ronald McNair, who died in the 1986 Space Shuttle Challenger explosion. The program's goal is to support and fund first-generation, low-income, and/or underrepresented students preparing for future doctoral studies. The program provides a variety of academic support and services. , the program has achieved a 93% graduate school acceptance rate.

In 2014, following its acquisition of 21 new Steinway-designed pianos, CSUDH was named an All-Steinway School, the first public four-year university in California to receive the designation. These instruments are subject to periodic inspections by Steinway factory representatives.

Sixty-five percent of CSUDH students engage in service learning, both through the formal curriculum and the university's service learning hub, the Center for Service Learning, Internships & Civic Engagement (SLICE). The university was Presidential Winner of the 2014 President's Higher Education Community Service Honor Roll. The Presidential Award is the highest federal recognition an institution can receive for its commitment to community, service-learning, and civic engagement.

The university focuses on the STEM disciplines, hosting the Annual STEM in Education Conference, offering the First-Year Undergraduate STEM Experience (FUSE), and in 2014 hosting the Women in STEM Conference. Its Center for Innovation in STEM Education was established in 2014 by a donation from the Annenberg Foundation and aims to improve local education with various STEM initiatives. CSUDH offers a Bachelor of Science in Computer Science, a Bachelor of Arts in Computer Technology with an option to concentrate in Homeland Security, and a Bachelor of Science in Information Technology. In 2017, it received a $4 million grant from Toyota to create an 87,000-square foot Science and Innovation Building to prepare students for careers in science, technology, engineering and math. The Toyota Center for Innovation in STEM Education, housed inside the building, includes a fabrication lab, high-tech classrooms, collaborative workspaces, and labs for K-12 teacher training.

Undergraduate programs

Popular majors for undergraduates in 2018 included Business Administration (Management and Operations) at 18.04%, Psychology (General) at 11.29%, Sociology at 8.01%. While popular majors for graduates were Education, General at 24.22%, Public Administration at 11.18%, and Registered Nursing, Nursing Administration, Nursing Research and Clinical Nursing at 10.31%

Rankings
CSUDH is nationally-ranked in three main categories:

1) Quality: Ranked in the "America's Top Colleges" by Forbes magazine, "Top Public Schools" by U.S. News & World Report, "Best Public Colleges" by Money magazine.

2) Value: Ranked in the "Best Bang for the Buck: West" by Washington Monthly, "24 Colleges with the Best ROI" by Business Insider, "Best Value in the West" by U.S. News & World Report.

3) Social Mobility: Ranked in the "2021 Social Mobility Index" by CollegeNET, "Top Performers of Social Mobility" by U.S. News & World Report.

The 2023 USNWR Best Regional Colleges West Rankings ranked CSUDH:
18 on Top Performers on Social Mobility
21 for Best Colleges for Veterans
25 on Top Public Schools
56 among Regional Universities West
247 in Nursing (tie)

The 2022 USNWR Best Regional Colleges West Rankings ranked CSUDH:
19 for Best Undergraduate Teaching
23 on Top Performers on Social Mobility
26 for Best Colleges for Veterans
27 on Top Public Schools
40 for Best Value Schools
59 among Regional Universities West
221 in Nursing (tie)

The 2022 USNWR Graduate Schools Rankings ranked CSUDH:
79 in Occupational Therapy
193 in Public Relations/Public Affairs
196 in Social Work

The Equal Opportunity Project ranked CSUDH 4 on the Overall Mobility Index, Business Insider ranked CSUDH 14 on Colleges with the Best Return on investment (ROI), and U.S. News & World Report, LendEDU.com 5 & 11 Lowest Student Debt.

Leo F. Cain Library and Gerth Archives

CSUDH opened its Library South Wing to the Leo F. Cain University Library in 2010. The expansion was honored with a Best of 2010 Award for Architectural Design from the California Construction journal and a 2011 Project Achievement Award from the Construction Management Association of America.

The library houses the Donald R. and Beverly Gerth Archives and Special Collections, home to the CSUDH archives, digital and special collections, rare books, and the official archives of the California State University system. Among the collections maintained at the Gerth Archives are:
California State University Japanese American Digitization Project (CSUJAD): A database consisting of primary documentation from 20 California institutions related to the history and progress of Japanese Americans in their communities. CSUDH has well over 25 physical collections on Japanese Americans including the Ninomiya Photo Studio Archives, with over 100,000 images.
Holt Labor Library Collection: Focusing on radical political movements mostly in the 20th century, the collection consists of over 1,000 linear feet of books, pamphlets, periodicals, and manuscript collections focused on labor, civil rights women's rights and anti-war movements.
Mayme Agnew Clayton Collection of African American History and Culture: A collection of more than 2 million rare books, films, documents, photographs, artifacts, and works of art related to the history and culture of African Americans in the United States, with a significant focus on Southern California and the American West.
LA Free Press Collection: Archive of materials from Art Kunkin, publisher and editor of the Los Angeles Free Press, one of the first and most important underground newspapers of the late 1960s and early 1970s.
Activist Collections: Materials on activism and social justice, including the Watts Labor Community Action Committee, Watts Rebellion Collection, Kaye Briegel Chicano Publication Collection, Feminist Resources Collection, Native American Activist Collection, Filipino Martial Law Materials, LGBTQ Periodical Collection, and other civil rights-related collections.

Athletics

CSUDH's athletic teams are known as the 'Cal State Dominguez Hills Toros', and the university's colors are burgundy and gold. CSUDH competes against other universities in nine varsity sports, in Division II of the NCAA in the California Collegiate Athletic Association.

CSUDH fields teams in several varsity-level sports:
Basketball (men and women)
Soccer (men and women)
Baseball (men)
Softball (women)
Volleyball (women)
Golf (men)
Track and Field (women)

The men's soccer team plays at Toro Stadium. Other sports venues include the Torodome for basketball and volleyball; Toro Field for baseball; and Toro Diamond for softball. Select home games are televised live via Internet TV.

Team accomplishments and notable alumni
The CSUDH men's soccer team has won two NCAA championships at the Division II level. In 2000, they defeated Barry University in the final by a score of 2–1. CSUDH won their second men's soccer title in 2008, beating Dowling College 3–0 in the final.
Many CSUDH Toros have gone on to professional careers in Major League Soccer and other leagues around the world:
 Tony Alfaro
 Alex Bengard
 Derby Carrillo
 Alejandro Covarrubias
 Chase Gentry
 Kevin Hartman
 Kei Kamara
 Kyle Polak
 Gyasi Zardes

The CSUDH women's soccer team won the 1991 NCAA Division II Championship, defeating Sonoma State 2–1 in the final. The CSUDH softball team won the NCAA Division II in 2022.

The CSUDH men's golf team won the 2015, 2016, 2018, and 2019 PGA Works Collegiate Golf Championship, a tournament open to Historically Minority Colleges.

The CSUDH baseball team is a member of the California Collegiate Athletic Association (CCAA) in NCAA Division II. Several Toro alumni have gone on to play in Major League Baseball:

 DeWayne Buice
 Craig Grebeck
 Jim Pena
 Kevin Pillar
 Bubby Rossman
 George Stablein
 La Rue Washington

The CSUDH women's track and field 4X4 relay team won the NCAA Division II Championship in 2011. The CSUDH track and field team competes in the CCAA as well. Its most notable alumna is Carmelita Jeter, who won gold, silver, and bronze medals at the 2012 Olympic Games in London. Another notable alumna is Grace Ann Dinkins, a sprinter who competed for her native Liberia in the 1984, 1996, and 2000 Olympics.

Esports
The CSUDH Esports Association was established in 2017. They have won three titles at national events sponsored by the National Esports Collegiate Conference (NECC): Valorant (Challengers Division) in 2020 and 2021; and Overwatch (Challengers Division) in 2021.

In 2021, it was announced that CSUDH would be constructing a new Esports Incubation Lab on the second floor of the Leo F. Cain Library on campus, to open in Spring 2022. The facility will include a broadcasting booth, competition stage, and classroom with furnishings and technology provided through partnerships with electronics companies ViewSonic and HyperX.

Dignity Health Sports Park
CSUDH is the home of Dignity Health Sports Park. Dignity Health Sports Park, formerly known as the Home Depot Center and StubHub Center, is a multiple-use sports complex on the West Coast of the United States, located on the campus of CSUDH. Its primary tenant is the LA Galaxy of Major League Soccer and its naming rights have been held since 2019 by health provider Dignity Health. The $150 million complex opened in 2003 and was developed by the Anschutz Entertainment Group, which remains the facility's operator. With a seating capacity of 27,000, it is the second-largest soccer-specific stadium in MLS, after BMO Field. During its first decade, the stadium's sponsor was hardware retailer The Home Depot, followed by six years of sponsorship by online ticket retailer StubHub. The Los Angeles Chargers of the National Football League used the stadium from 2017 until the completion of SoFi Stadium in 2020. The San Diego State Aztecs football team used the stadium as their home venue for the 2020 and 2021 seasons. The Los Angeles Wildcats of the XFL also played at the stadium during their one season of existence.

Dignity Health Sports Park was the site of the 2003 FIFA Women's World Cup Final. The United States men's and women's national soccer teams often use the facility for training camps and some home matches. During the 2028 Summer Olympics, the venue will host rugby, modern pentathlon, tennis, and field hockey.

Economic impact

CSU Dominguez Hills has over 110,000 alumni, of whom 60% live and work within  of the campus. The university plays a major role in the region's economy — a recent economic impact study revealed CSU Dominguez Hills generates a total impact of $519 million annually in the South Bay. This impact sustains over 5,600 jobs in the region and statewide economy. Per year, the impact generates more than $45 million in statewide tax revenue. More than $2.1 billion of the earnings by alumni from CSU Dominguez Hills are attributable to their CSU degrees. The average amount of debt its students accumulate is $14,585.

Notable people

Alumni

Ronnie Aguilar – professional basketball player
Felipe Aguirre – politician
Stewart Alexander – politician
Tony Alfaro – professional soccer player
Karen Bass, politician, mayor of Los Angeles, member of the House of Representatives from California's 37th congressional district (2013-2022)
Alex Bengard – professional soccer player
Glenn Berggoetz – filmmaker
Tiffiny Blacknell – criminal defense attorney and community activist 
Steven Bradford- politician, State senator for the 35th district
Patrick Burke – Professional golfer
Joe Buscaino – politician, member of the Los Angeles City Council
Luis M. Campos – chemistry academic
Josue Cartagena – professional soccer player
Taleah Carter
Derby Carrillo – professional soccer player
Chris Conkling – screenwriter
Chris Conrad – cannabis expert
Jeff Coopwood – Emmy-nominated actor, broadcaster, educator
Alejandro Covarrubias – professional soccer player
Mike Davis – politician
Grace-Ann Dinkins – Olympic 100m track runner, surgeon, philanthropist
Jason Farol – singer, Duets (TV series)
Babatunde Fowler – politician
Ryo Fujii
David Garza
Chase Gentry – professional soccer player
Clarence Gilyard – actor, Matlock and Walker, Texas Ranger
Faiivae Iuli Alex Godinet – politician
Danny Grissett – musician
Dan Guerrero – athletic director for the University of California, Los Angeles
Michael Happoldt – musician, DJ, producer Sublime
Sweet Alice Harris – community activist
Kevin Hartman – Major League Soccer goalkeeper
Robert Hecker – musician
Hue Hollins – professional basketball referee
Jerome Horton – California State Assemblyman for the 51st District
Earl Ofari Hutchinson – author
Carmelita Jeter – American sprinter; gold, silver and bronze medalist at 2012 Summer Olympics
Kei Kamara – professional soccer player
Brian Kehew – musician, The Moog Cookbook
John Langley – producer, COPS
Nativo Lopez – politician
Robert Mann – historian
Bob Mann – journalist, head of the Department of Journalism at Louisiana State University
 Yael Markovich – Israeli/American model and beauty queen/pageant titleholder (Miss Israel)
Janelle McGee – professional soccer player
Cora Martin-Moore – gospel singer
Niecy Nash – actress, Reno 911!, Claws, dancer on Dancing with the Stars
Josh Oppenheimer – Israeli-American professional basketball coach, and former professional basketball player
Finbarr O'Neill – former CEO of J.D. Power, Mitsubishi Motors North America, and Hyundai Motor America
Raymond F. Palmer – professor of biostatistics
James Peoples – transportation economist and professor of economics
Eric J. Perrodin – politician
Christopher Phillips – academic
Susan A. Phillips – professor of anthropology 
Kevin Pillar — Major League Baseball outfielder for the Los Angeles Dodgers
Kyle Polak – professional soccer player
Rex Richardson – politician
Rodney Allen Rippy – actor
Lela Rochon – actress, Harlem Nights, Why Do Fools Fall in Love
Bubby Rossman ('14) – major league baseball pitcher for the Philadelphia Phillies
Karen Sandler – author
Jiovanni Santana – professional soccer player
Gerald Schoenewolf – psychologist
Doug Siebum – audio engineer
Louis Silas – record executive, Silas Records
Scott Shaw – author, martial artist, and filmmaker
Ariana Stein (née Sauceda) – Lil' Libros publisher and author
Chris Strait – comedian
Ben Swann – television anchor
Gabriela Soto Laveaga – historian of science specializing in Latin America at Harvard University. 
Chizuko Judy Sugita de Queiroz – artist
Ben Swann – Emmy and Edward R. Murrow award-winning journalist 
Leo James Terrell – civil rights attorney and talk radio host
Bobby Tossetti – athletic director
John Tracy – aerospace executive, Senior Vice President of The Boeing Company (retired)
Steffan Tubbs – journalist, two-time winner of the Edward R. Murrow award
La Rue Washington, outfielder for the Texas Rangers in Major League Baseball
Deb Vanasse – author
Gyasi Zardes – Major League Soccer striker

Notable faculty
Teodross Avery, Assistant Professor of Jazz Studies and Contemporary Music
Nancy D. Erbe, Professor of Negotiation, Conflict Resolution and Peacebuilding, Fulbright Program Distinguished Chair 
Gilah Yelin Hirsch, Professor of Art
C. Augustus Martin, Professor of Criminal Justice Administration, Director of School of Public Service and Justice

See also

Notes

References

External links
 

 
1960 establishments in California
Carson, California
Educational institutions established in 1960
Schools accredited by the Western Association of Schools and Colleges
Universities and colleges in Los Angeles County, California
California State University, Dominguez Hills
Dominguez Hills